Halifax is a town and a coastal locality in the Shire of Hinchinbrook, Queensland, Australia.

Geography

History
August Anderssen, a blacksmith, purchased the land in 1880 after which time the land was turned into sugar plantations.

Herbert River Provisional School opened on 24 September 1883. It was renamed Halifax Provisional School in 1885. It became Halifax State School in 1891.

Halifax Post Office opened on 23 August 1886.

St Peter's Catholic School opened in 1927.

Halifax Methodist Church opened in 1964. When the Methodist Church amalgamated into the Uniting Church in Australia in 1977, it became Halifax Uniting Church.

Many homes in Halifax were flooded following extremely heavy rain in March 2018.

Heritage listings
Halifax has a number of heritage-listed sites, including:

 Macrossan Street: Row of Street Trees

Amenities
The town has a town hall and regular community markets.

Hinchinbrook Shire Council operates a library service at Halifax. The library is on Macrossan Street and is open Monday, Wednesday, Friday and Saturday.

The Herbert River Museum is located on Macrossan Street in Halifax and is open 9am-12pm Tuesday to Saturday.

The Halifix branch of the Queensland Country Women's Association meets at the CWA Hall at 53 Macrossan Street.

Halifax Uniting Church is at 12 Anderssen Street. It is part of the North Queensland Presbytery of the Uniting Church in Australia.

Education 
Halifax State School is a government primary (Prep-6) school for boys and girls at 17 Victoria Terrace. In 2017, the school had an enrolment of 22 students with 4 teachers (2 full-time equivalent) and 4 non-teaching staff (2 full-time equivalent).

St Peter's Catholic School is a Catholic primary (Prep-6) school for boys and girls at 15-17 Anderssen Street. In 2017, the school had an enrolment of 37 students with 4 teachers (3 full-time equivalent) and 4 non-teaching staff (2 full-time equivalent).

There is no secondary school in Halifax; the nearest is in Ingham.

References

External links

 
 Town map of Halifax, 1982

North Queensland
Towns in Queensland
Populated places established in 1880
Shire of Hinchinbrook
1880 establishments in Australia
Coastline of Queensland
Localities in Queensland